José Nino Gavazzo (2 October 1939 – 26 June 2021) was a Uruguayan army colonel. He was a member of the Servicio de Información y Defensa (SID).

Biography 
Gavazzo was chief of the Uruguayan branch of Operation Condor and took part in the forced disappearance of the stepdaughter of Juan Gelman in Germany.

José Nino Gavazzo died from a stroke in Montevideo on 26 June 2021 at the age of 81.

References 

1939 births
2021 deaths
Uruguayan colonels
People from Montevideo